The Mansfield Football Netball Club, nicknamed the Eagles, is an Australian rules football and netball club based in Mansfield, Victoria.

The Mansfield teams currently compete in the Goulburn Valley League. The Eagles home ground is the Mansfield Recreation Reserve.

History
The seed of the Mansfield FC was planted because of an advertisement in the Mansfield Guardian on 18 May 1878. The ad called for a meeting to be held at the Mansfield Hotel with the purpose of forming a football club.

Surviving records of those times describe a game between Mansfield and Jamieson in July 1883. Nevertheless, in 1886 the Mansfield Courier reported that Mansfield had fielded teams in 1881. 

Early games were played against neighbouring towns on a round robin basis with the teams playing for trophies donated by prominent businessmen. The original shirt worn by Mansfield was white with red stripes. In 1900 these local clubs formed an Association, adopted a constitution and began a formal competition for points culminating in a final series. Mansfield played many clubs in this era in various leagues and associations. Jamieson, Bonnie Doon, Merton, Maindample, Delatite, Mt Battery, Swanpool, Tolmie, Yarck, among others.

Between the wars the district became unable to maintain numerous clubs, so the various smaller ones morphed towards the larger Mansfield FC and Mount Battery FC. Eventually these two formed the "Mansfield Battery FC", adopting a navy blue guernsey with a white monogram.

Mansfield competed continuously in the various District Associations until after World War II when the club joined the Waranga North East FL. The netball section would be added later.

Trent Hotton, won the league best and fairest in 2007. The Eagles won their first GVFL premiership in 2004 since moving to the league in 1997. In 2009 the Eagles capped off a fantastic year with a win in the GVFL Grand Final over Kyabram, capturing their second GVFL flag in five years.

Leagues 
Since its foundation, the club has participated in the following leagues:

 1925–33: Mansfield Line Association
 1934–40: Mansfield-Alexandra FA
 1945–46: Upper Goulburn FL
 1946–77: Waranga North East FL
 1977–95: Tungamah Football League
 1996–97: Goulburn Valley FL (2nd Division)
 1998–present: Goulburn Valley FL

Players

2010 Football Squad

Matt Storer and Guy Taylor are Eagles Co-Captains for the 2010 season.
The Eagles Seniors are coached by ex-Collingwood player, Craig 'Ned' Kelly.

VFL / AFL Players
The following footballers played with Mansfield prior to playing senior VFL / AFL football. The year indicates their VFL / AFL debut.
 1922 - Jim Fraser - Carlton
 1950 - Bill Reardon - Footscray
 1953 - Tom Tarrant - Collingwood
 1955 - Alan Jewell - Hawthorn
 1955 - Ray Yeoman - Hawthorn
 1957 - Peter Barran - Geelong
 1962 - Peter Dolling - South Melbourne
 1962 - Bob Lockhart - Richmond
 2000 - Josh Fraser - Collingwood & Gold Coast
 2005 - Jarrod Kayler-Thomson - 
 2017 - James Cousins - Hawthorn

The following players/coaches came to Mansfield, with prior VFL / AFL senior football experience - 
 1942 - Ted Leehane - Essendon
 1982 - Peter Tossol - Melbourne
 1989 - Craig Kelly - ex-Collingwood and player manager.
 1990 - Brendan Hehir - Draft Number 17, in AFL 1990 National Draft. Geelong, Australian Football League
 1993 - Andrew Tranquilli - ex-Collingwood player in the Australian Football League
 1992 - David Mensch - ex-Geelong player in the Australian Football League
 1994 - Trent Hotton - ex-Carlton player in the Australian Football League
 1997 - Darren Hulme - Carlton
 1999 - David A. Clarke - Geelong & Carlton
 2005 - Craig Flint - Number 17 in 2005 AFL Rookie Draft. Carlton

Premierships 
 Mansfield Hotel / Bremner's Cup (1): 
1900
 Mansfield FA (3): 
1900, 1904, 1905
 Mansfield District FA (3): 
1911, 1912, 1913
 Mansfield Swanpool District FA (1): 
1927
 Mansfield Line FA (1): 
1929
 Waranga North Eastern Football Association (4): 
1951, 1953, 1954, 1955
 Tungamah Football League (2): 
1987, 1989
 Goulburn Valley 2nd. Division (1): 
1996
Goulburn Valley FL (2): 
2004, 2009

Grand Finals

Football League Best & Fairest honors
Seniors
Tungamah Football League
 1987 - Bruce McCormack
 1988 - Bruce McCormack

Goulburn Valley Football League - Division 2
1997 - Dennis Sheahan

Goulburn Valley Football League
 2007 - Trent Hotton

Notes

References

External links

Official website

Australian rules football clubs in Victoria (Australia)
1880s establishments in Australia
Goulburn Valley Football League clubs
Netball teams in Victoria (Australia)